The 2007 ARFU Women's Rugby Championship was the second edition of the tournament. It was hosted by China again, in Kunming and took place on the 2nd and 4th of November. It featured two new teams — Japan and Kazakhstan, with hosts, China, and Singapore. Kazakhstan defeated defending champions, China, 34–5 to win the tournament.

Standings

Bracket

Results

Semi-finals

3rd place playoff

Final

References 

2007 in Asian rugby union
2007 in women's rugby union
Asia Rugby Women's Championship
Rugby union in China
Rugby union in Japan
Rugby union in Singapore
Rugby union in Kazakhstan
Asia Rugby
Asia Rugby Women's Championship